The Goryeosa, or History of Goryeo, is the main surviving historical record of Korea's Goryeo dynasty. It was composed nearly a century after the fall of Goryeo, during the reign of King Sejong, undergoing repeated revisions between 1392 and 1451. He ordered a committee of scholars led by Kim Jongseo and Jeong Inji to compile it, based on primary and secondary sources that are no longer extant.

The Goryeo-sa, written using Hanja script, consists of 139 volumes, 46 of which consist of chronicles, 39 of geography, 2 of Chronological tables, 50 of Biographies, and 2 of lists. The document has been digitized by the National Institute of Korean History and available online with Modern Korean translation in Hangul and original text in Hanja script.

See also 
 Dongguk Tonggam
 Samguk Sagi
 Annals of the Joseon Dynasty
 History of Korea

References

External links 

 The official website showing the original text as well as the translation in Korean Hangul (National Institute of Korean History)
 Goryeosa 高麗史   

 

History books about Korea
Goryeo
Joseon dynasty works
Chinese-language literature of Korea